Richard Ommanney is an English writer who has written extensively for TV. He initially trained as an actor at the Central School Of School of Speech and Drama.

On TV he appeared in Get Some In, Red Letter Day, The Dragon's Opponent, and Jane Eyre in which he played Stephanie Beacham's brother Lord Ingram.

In 1973/74 he spent a year in the West End at the Savoy Theatre in A Ghost on Tiptoe  which starred Robert Morley. In 1976 he spent three months in Holland filming A Bridge Too Far directed by Richard Attenborough.

His final appearance on stage was at the Citizens Theatre Glasgow alongside Pierce Brosnan and Ciaran Hinds in the world premiere of Noël Coward's Semi-Monde. In 1985 he made his situation comedy writing debut with the BBC sitcom Three Up, Two Down. The first series topped the ratings and was followed by three more. Three Up Two Down has been optioned four times by American TV. In 1989 Richard spent five months in Los Angeles working on a pilot of Three Up Two Down with Winifred Hervey for CBS where it became Five Up Two Down.

He wrote the first series of All At No.20 which starred Maureen Lipman and Martin Clunes. Also in the cast was Gregory Doran who was eventually to run the Royal Shakespeare Company. He created and wrote two series of the yuppie love triangle Square Deal for LWT. The series starred Tim Bentinck who went on to co-star in Made in Heaven with Louisa Rix. Tim Bentinck wrote an account of Richard and Louisa Rix meeting for the first time in his book which recounts his life as David Archer. He created and wrote two series of the sitcom Side by Side for BBC TV starring Louisa Rix and Gareth Hunt.

He wrote many episodes for Dutch TV comedy series including Oppassen!, Ben zo Terug, and Bergen Binnen, and the police drama Luifel & Luifel.

He wrote eight episodes of police drama  The Bill. He ghosted film-maker Daryl Goodrich's account of his promotional films that helped secure the 2012 Olympic Games for London. His first stage play The Making Of Julia was produced at The Mill at Sonning. His first novel Jerome's Angel is a romantic comedy.

Personal life

Richard has two daughters, Sophie and Lisa.

He married Louisa Rix in 1994.

His step-children are Charlotte and Jolyon Coy.

References

External links
 
 

British screenwriters
Living people
British television writers
Year of birth missing (living people)